Andy Nicholson is an English production designer who has worked on various films, including Gravity, Divergent, Assassin's Creed, and Jurassic World: Fallen Kingdom. Nicholson has also worked as an art director for numerous films, including several by director Tim Burton.

Career

Art director
Nicholson has worked several times with director Tim Burton, starting in 1999 as an art director on Sleepy Hollow. Nicholson subsequently worked as an art director on Burton's Charlie and the Chocolate Factory (2005), and later collaborated with Burton as a supervising art director on Alice in Wonderland (2010) and as a visual development art director on Frankenweenie (2012). Other art direction credits include Tony Scott's Spy Game (2001), Neil Jordan's The Good Thief (2002), and Wolfgang Petersen's Troy (2004).

His credits as a supervising art director include Anthony Minghella's Breaking and Entering (2006), Nancy Meyers' The Holiday (2006), Guy Ritchie's RocknRolla (2008), and Joe Johnston's The Wolfman (2010).

Further art director credits include Paul Greengrass's The Bourne Ultimatum (2007), Chris Weitz's The Golden Compass (2007), and Johnston's Captain America: The First Avenger (2011).

Production designer
As a production designer, Nicholson worked with director Alfonso Cuarón on the 2013 film Gravity, as well as the 2013 film The Host, directed by Andrew Niccol. He also served as the production designer on the 2014 science fiction action film Divergent for director Neil Burger, and served in the same position on the 2016 film Assassin's Creed under the direction of Justin Kurzel. After working for director J. A. Bayona on the 2018 film Jurassic World: Fallen Kingdom, Nicholson began design work on the 2019 film Captain Marvel for directors Anna Boden and Ryan Fleck.

Awards and nominations
Nicholson won an Art Directors Guild (ADG) Award for his work on Sleepy Hollow, and was nominated for another ADG Award for his work as an art director on Charlie and the Chocolate Factory. Nicholson won another ADG Award for his work on The Golden Compass, and received ADG Award nominations for The Bourne Ultimatum and Captain America: The First Avenger. For his work on Gravity, Nicholson was nominated for a BAFTA and an Academy Award for Best Production Design at the 86th Academy Awards.

References

External links

Andy Nicholson | Homepage

Living people
American production designers
Year of birth missing (living people)
Place of birth missing (living people)